Himlen är oskyldigt blå may refer to:

 Blue Virgin Isles (song)
 Behind Blue Skies, 2010 Swedish film